The Swedish Arts Council (or Kulturrådet) is a Swedish administrative authority organized under the Ministry of Culture, and is tasked with promoting culture and its availability by distributing and following up on government grants, on the basis of the national cultural policy objectives, as determined by the Riksdag. The agency works to promote particular artistic and cultural-valuable development in activities related to the performing arts, music, literature, art magazines, public libraries and the fine arts; as well as museums and exhibitions, regional cultural activities and national minorities' culture.

History
The Swedish Arts Council (p.k.a. The Swedish National Council for Cultural Affairs) was established in 1974, in conjunction with the cultural policy
decision of that year, as a public authority with the mission of bringing to fruition the cultural policies adopted by the Riksdag and the government. Since then, the cultural policies of Sweden have been revised by the Riksdag a number of times. In 1996, the special significance of literature was highlighted through the adoption of a separate piece of legislation, the Library Act. In 2009 a decision to amend the principles for disbursement of state subsidies were adopted. Thus, since 2011, the regions disburse a bigger proportion of the state subsidies.

Organisation 
The agency has about 120 people working at their office, located at Filmhuset in Stockholm, and is led by a board of directors appointed by the government. The Board has full operational responsibility, and consists of nine members. The Director-General is the chief operating officer, answering to the board of directors. The Board decides on, inter alia, the budget and some government grants.

Appointed members of the board   :

 Ulrika Årehed Kågström, Secretary-General of the Swedish Cancer Society (Chairman)
 Ann-Sofie Köping Olsson, university lecturer and academic (Vice Chairman) 
Kajsa Ravin, Director General of the Swedish Arts Council
 Kjell Englund, Director of Wermland Opera
 Malena Ernman, artist
 Aris Fioretos, author and professor
 Po Tidholm, journalist and author
 Ellen Nyman, actress, director and artist
Thomas Pålsson, former Director General of Statens servicecenter

Other commitments
The Swedish Arts Council participates in several international projects and awards grants for international cultural exchange. Examples of this are: The Astrid Lindgren Memorial Award and the European Union Creative Europe Desk.

Astrid Lindgren Memorial Award

The Astrid Lindgren Memorial Award, instituted by the Swedish Government in 2002, is the world's largest international award for literature for children and young people and the second largest literary award in the world. The award is administered by the council and is presented annually to authors, illustrators, storytellers and people or organisations promoting reading.

See also
 Ministry of Culture
 Culture of Sweden
 Arts council

Notes

References

External links
The Swedish Arts Council – Official website 

Government agencies of Sweden
Arts councils
Swedish culture
1974 establishments in Sweden
Arts organizations established in 1974